The Air University Multan Campus is a new campus of Air University (Islamabad) located in Multan, Punjab, Pakistan. It was established in 2011. It is located along Bahawalpur Road Multan with a purpose built campus.

Departments 
Air University Multan Campus has now three main departments:
 Department of Business Administration
 Department of Computer Science
 Department of Mathematics
 Upcoming Departments Aviation, Engineering

Degree programs
Degree programs offered by Air University Multan Campus are given below:

 BBA (Hons.)
 BS Accounting and Finance
 BS Computer Science
 BS Software Engineering
 BS Information Technology
 BS Mathematics
 BS Cyber Security 
 MBA
 MS Management Sciences
 MS Computer Science
 MS Mathematics
 PhD Management Sciences

See also
 Pakistan Air Force schools and colleges

References

External links
 Air University Multan Campus official website

Universities and colleges in Multan
2011 establishments in Pakistan
Educational institutions established in 2011
Pakistan Air Force